Anthony Glenn Curtale (born January 29, 1962) is an American former professional ice hockey player and was most recently the head coach of the Wichita Falls Wildcats in the North American Hockey League. He was drafted by the Calgary Flames in the second round, 31st overall in the 1980 NHL Entry Draft.

Curtale played only two games in his National Hockey League career, for the Flames in 1980–81 as a late season call-up from his junior hockey club, the Brantford Alexanders.  He would spend the rest of his playing career in the minors, playing for the Colorado Flames for two seasons, before joining the Peoria Rivermen until his retirement in 1987.

After his playing career, Curtale later served as the head coach of the Springfield Jr. Blues in the North American Hockey League (NAHL) from 1995 to 1997 and then the Windsor Spitfires of the Ontario Hockey League (OHL) from 1997 to 1999. He returned to the NAHL with the Texas Tornado from 1999 until 2007 and lead the team to long string of success with four Robertson Cup Championships.  He returned to the Tornado after coaching in the youth leagues in 2011 and lead the team to a fifth league championship. When he left again in 2013, he was the winningest head coach in NAHL history. In 2016, he was hired by the NAHL's Wichita Falls Wildcats as head coach, however, he was indefinitely suspended by the team that November. He was released by the Wildcats on December 1.

Career statistics

References

External links 

1962 births
American men's ice hockey defensemen
Brantford Alexanders players
Calgary Flames players
Calgary Flames draft picks
Colorado Flames players
Ice hockey people from Detroit
Living people
Oklahoma City Stars players
Peoria Rivermen (IHL) players
Windsor Spitfires coaches
Peoria Prancers players